Generically speaking, a sports network broadcasts sporting events, sports news and other related programming

Sports Network may also refer to:

 The Sports Network (TSN), the Canadian sports cable channel
 All Sports Network, the former name of Sports Illustrated Television in Asia
 Eleven Sports Network, the multinational group of sports television channels

 In the United States:
 Sports Network, the former name of the now-defunct Hughes Television Network in the United States
 The Sports Network (wire service), the former American sports wire service
 CBS Sports Network
 Fox Sports Networks
 Eleven Sports Network (United States)

See also
 Sportsnet (disambiguation)